The Cheyenne Mountain Highway, also called Cheyenne Mountain Zoo Road, is a road in Colorado Springs, Colorado that begins at the intersection of Penrose Boulevard, Old Stage Road, and West Cheyenne Mountain Boulevard. It is a paved road to the Cheyenne Mountain Zoo and the Will Rogers Shrine of the Sun. Thereafter, it is an unpaved private road to one of the peaks of the mountain, known as The Horns.

Geography
Cheyenne Mountain has three peaks. Cheyenne Mountain Highway ends at The Horns.

Description
The road is paved to the Will Rogers Shrine of the Sun, thereafter it is a  unpaved road to The Horns, where The Broadmoor's Cloud Camp is located. This was formerly the site of the Cheyenne Mountain Lodge. There are gates that control the access to the road: two after the Cheyenne Mountain Zoo and a third after the Will Rogers Shrine. The Broadmoor has maintained the road for the transport of guests to Cloud Camp. A portion of the road is named Cheyenne Mountain Zoo Road. The Cheyenne Mountain Highway was originally built for transportation to properties built by Spencer Penrose, which came to include the zoo, the shrine, and the top of the mountain.

History

Road to Broadmoor properties
After building The Broadmoor, Spencer Penrose began to develop Cheyenne Mountain property that he purchased on the northern peak in 1915. He built the  Cheyenne Mountain Highway in 1925. It afforded views of Colorado Springs and Pikes Peak.

Penrose hired Civilian Conservation Corps (CCC) workers to build the unpaved decomposed gravel toll road. In the depressed economy, this provided work for individuals in need of jobs and helped him to manage construction costs. The cost of the construction was $350,000.  In 1926, the Cheyenne Mountain Lodge opened at the top of Cheyenne Mountain. Visitors could make the trip up the highway to the lodge on the backs of elephants, such as an elephant given to Penrose by an Indian rajah.

The toll gate was situated on the highway just before the Cheyenne Mountain Zoo (1926), and the Will Rogers Shrine of the Sun (1937) was built on the northern promontory of the mountain.  The Broadmoor also operated a ski area from 1959-1991 on Cheyenne Mountain, near the Broadmoor Shooting Range. The highway was rebuilt and widened, received several scenic turnouts, and paved with asphaltic concrete following a flood that washed out the road in July 1965.  It reopened in April 1966.

Cog railroad
Penrose opened the original Broadmoor-Cheyenne Mountain Zoo Cog Railroad in June 1938, and Shirley Temple was a passenger on its first run. The train was a replica of the steam trains operated by the Manitou and Pike's Peak Railway In 1950, a "new streamlined" cog train called the Broadmoor Mountaineer was dedicated by Charles L. Tutt, Jr., The Broadmoor's president, and J. F. Gordon, the president of Cadillac Motor Company, who operated the train on its inaugural ride.

Cheyenne Mountain Cog Railroad offered service on a narrow gauge road from The Broadmoor to the Cheyenne Mountain Zoo from 1961 until 1974. The railway engine called The Mountaineer was a small edition of the narrow gauge cog trains used to climb Pikes Peak. Two Plexiglas-topped cars, each carrying up to 20 people, took passengers for a  ride through four tunnels. The ride began at a boarding station by the lake at The Broadmoor and stopped at the zoo's entrance, the Thundergod House.

See also
 Cheyenne Mountain Air Force Station (NORAD), for NORAD Road

Notes

References

External links

Transportation in Colorado Springs, Colorado
Historic trails and roads in Colorado
Highway